The Big Client is a 1961 Australian television play. It was directed by James Upshaw. It screened "live" on the ABC on 19 July 1961 and was recorded in Sydney Australian TV drama was relatively rare at the time.

Plot
In London, Henderson is an American millionaire launching a brand of tranquillisers. Fred Cooper, head of a London advertising firm JCB, tries to get Henderson to sign with them. Fred is ruthless, more so than three directors of JCB, Sam Bloomberg, Philip Comely and Peter Jones.

Cast
James Condon as Henderson		
Barry Linehan as Fred Cooper		
Alistair Duncan as a copywriter Dave Mason, a crippled ad exec
Ric Hutton as Peter Jones, a playboy
Noel Brophy as Sam Bloomberg, advertising director of JCB	
Deryck Barnes as Philip Comely, director of JCB
Keith Buckley as Geoff Manning, recently fired from a rival firm
Coralie Neville as Greta Heffner, Fred's secretary
Pamela Page	as girl from rival firm, Jennifer King, who is friends with Fred Cooper	
Diana Perryman as Eleanor Comely, Philip's wife

Production
The play by British writers Eric Paice and Michael Hulke had been filmed on British TV in 1959 directed by Ted Kotcheff. Geoffrey Wedlock did the sets.

Reception
The TV critic from the Sydney Morning Herald thought an advertising executive would have.been hard put to clarify the curious dramatic direction—embracing shifts of meaning and emphasis" in the play, adding "it was a fault of the play_, not, generally speaking, of the actors or of James Upshaw's compact though not very imaginative production."

References

External links
The Big Client at IMDb
The Big Client at National Archives of Australia

1960s Australian television plays